Return on asset minus the risk free return. Or how much more an asset returns in contrast to risk free asset.

Re=R-Rf